Nicholas Gotfredsen (born 5 February 1989) is a Danish footballer who plays as a defender for amateur club Vigerslev BK.

References 

 Gotfredsen og Stankov forlader Viborg, bold.dk, 26 May 2016

External links
 

1989 births
Living people
Danish men's footballers
Association football defenders
Danish Superliga players
Danish 1st Division players
Brøndby IF players
FC Nordsjælland players
Hellerup IK players
Aarhus Fremad players
AaB Fodbold players
Viborg FF players
FC Fredericia players
Hobro IK players
People from Brøndby Municipality
Sportspeople from the Capital Region of Denmark